Paraplatyptilia is a genus of moths in the family Pterophoridae.

Species
Paraplatyptilia albiciliatus 
Paraplatyptilia albidus 
Paraplatyptilia albidorsellus 
Paraplatyptilia albui 
Paraplatyptilia atlantica 
Paraplatyptilia auriga 
Paraplatyptilia azteca 
Paraplatyptilia baueri 
Paraplatyptilia bifida 
Paraplatyptilia carolina 
Paraplatyptilia catharodactyla 
Paraplatyptilia cooleyi 
Paraplatyptilia dugobae 
Paraplatyptilia edwardsii 
Paraplatyptilia fragilis 
Paraplatyptilia glacialis 
Paraplatyptilia grandis 
Paraplatyptilia hedemanni 
Paraplatyptilia immaculata 
Paraplatyptilia inanis 
Paraplatyptilia lineata 
Paraplatyptilia lutescens 
Paraplatyptilia maea 
Paraplatyptilia metzneri 
Paraplatyptilia modesta 
Paraplatyptilia nana 
Paraplatyptilia optata 
Paraplatyptilia petrodactylus 
Paraplatyptilia sabourini 
Paraplatyptilia sahlbergi 
Paraplatyptilia shastae 
Paraplatyptilia sibirica 
Paraplatyptilia terminalis 
Paraplatyptilia terskeyiensis 
Paraplatyptilia vacillans 
Paraplatyptilia watkinsi 
Paraplatyptilia xylopsamma

References 

 
Platyptiliini
Moth genera